Pyramidula rupestris is a species of very small, air-breathing land snails, terrestrial pulmonate gastropod mollusks or micromollusks in the family Pyramidulidae. 

The variety Pyramidula rupestris var. nylanderi Morse, 1920is a synonym of Planogyra asteriscus (Morse, 1857)

Shell description
The width of the shell is up to 2.7 mm, the height is up to 2.5 mm.

Distribution
This species occurs in:
 The entire Mediterranean region
 Dalmatia
 Spain
 The Alps
 Northern Italy
 Greece
 Israel
 Asia
 Morocco

References

 Gittenberger, E. & Bank, R.A. (1996). A new start in Pyramidula (Gastropoda Pulmonata: Pyramidellidae). Basteria, 60 (1/3): 71-78. Leiden
 Kerney, M.P., Cameron, R.A.D. & Jungbluth, J-H. (1983). Die Landschnecken Nord- und Mitteleuropas. Ein Bestimmungsbuch für Biologen und Naturfreunde, 384 pp., 24 plates.
 Sysoev, A. V. & Schileyko, A. A. (2009). Land snails and slugs of Russia and adjacent countries. Sofia/Moskva (Pensoft). 312 pp., 142 plates
 Bank, R. A.; Neubert, E. (2017). Checklist of the land and freshwater Gastropoda of Europe. Last update: July 16th, 2017

External links
 Image of two live individuals in situ
 Draparnaud, J. P. R. (1801). Tableau des mollusques terrestres et fluviatiles de la France. Montpellier / Paris (Renaud / Bossange, Masson & Besson). 1-116
 Bourguignat, J.-R. (1852). Testacea novissima quæ Cl. de Saulcy in itinere per Orientem annis 1850 et 1851, collegit. pp. [1, 5-31; Lutetiæ: Baillière]

Pyramidulidae
Gastropods described in 1801